Johan August Ekman (26 November 1845, Hjälstad - 1913) was Archbishop of Uppsala, Sweden, 1900–1913.

Biography
Johan Ekman was the son of  Olof Ekman and Maria, born Johansdotter.
He was a student of theology at the University of Uppsala receiving his Licentiate of Theology in 1870 and was ordained into the priesthood in 1873.
He was earned his Bachelor of Theology (teol. kand.) in 1876. He became a professor of theology at Uppsala University in 1887 and received his  Doctor of Theology (dr. theol.) in 1893. Thereafter he worked as a vicar and held other church offices.

He was elected Bishop of the Diocese of Västerås in 1898; and appointed Archbishop of Uppsala in 1900.
Ekman played a decisive role in the development of the Lay ecclesial ministry. 
In 1903, the General Swedish clergy association (Allmänna svenska prästföreningen) was founded and in 1910 the Church of Sweden National Board for Parish Life  (Svenska kyrkans diakonistyrelse).

Selected works
The origins of Christian Priesthood (1882) 
Miracles and Spiritual Inspirations (1883) 
 The Naturalistic Paganism (1886-1888)

References

Other sources
Santell, Fredrik (2016) Svenska kyrkans diakonistyrelse: Tillflöden och tillkomst, organisation och verksamhet intill 1938 (Uppsala University)

External links
 Nordiskt familjebok, article Johan August Ekman
 Svenskt biografiskt handlexikon, article Johan August Ekman In Swedish

1845 births
1913 deaths
People from Töreboda Municipality
Uppsala University alumni
Academic staff of Uppsala University
Lutheran archbishops of Uppsala
20th-century Lutheran archbishops
Burials at Uppsala old cemetery